Qlisura (or Qalisura, Callisura, from kleisoura) was a diocese in the Syriac Orthodox metropolitan province of Melitene (modern Malatya), attested between the ninth and thirteenth centuries.  Eighteen Jacobite bishops of Qlisura are mentioned in the histories of Michael the Syrian and Bar Hebraeus, and in other West Syriac sources.  By 1283, as a result of several decades of warfare and brigandage, the diocese of Qlisura was ruined, though it apparently still had a bishop several years later.  The diocese is not again mentioned, and seems to have lapsed around the end of the thirteenth century.

Sources 

The main primary source for the Jacobite bishops of Qlisura is the record of episcopal consecrations appended to Volume III of the Chronicle of the Jacobite patriarch Michael the Syrian (1166–99).  In this Appendix Michael listed most of the bishops consecrated by the Jacobite patriarchs of Antioch between the ninth and twelfth centuries.  Twenty-eight Jacobite patriarchs sat during this period, and in many cases Michael was able to list the names of the bishops consecrated during their reigns, their monasteries of origin, and the place where they were consecrated.  For the thirteenth century, Michael's lists are supplemented by several references in the Chronicon Syriacum and Chronicon Ecclesiasticum of the Jacobite maphrian Bar Hebraeus (ob.1286).

Location 
Qlisura was a small town near Melitene (modern Malatya), in eastern Turkey.

Bishops of Qlisura 
Seventeen bishops of Qlisura are mentioned in the lists of Michael the Syrian.

Further details of some of these bishops are supplied in the narrative sections of the Chronicle of Michael the Syrian and in the Chronicon Ecclesiasticum of Bar Hebraeus:

Abraham (1004/1030) consecrated the patriarch Dionysius IV Heheh in 1032 (or, according to Bar Hebraeus, 1034).
Iwanis (1042/1057) is separately attested in 1054.
Iwanis (1139/1166) is known to have been flogged by the Turks of Hanzit in 1141, and was present at the consecration of the patriarch Michael the Syrian in 1166, when his name was recorded as Yohannan.
Iwanis bar Qanun (1166/1199) was present at the synod of Modiq in 1222 which met to elect the patriarch Ignatius III David (1222–52).

In 1283, according to Bar Hebraeus, the diocese of Qlisura and the other suffragan dioceses of the province of Melitene were ruined:

Even if I wanted to be patriarch, as many others do, what is there to covet in the appointment, since so many dioceses of the East have been devastated?  Should I set my heart on Antioch, where sighs and groans will meet me?  Or the holy diocese of Gumal, where nobody is left to piss against a wall?  Or Aleppo, or Mabbugh, or Callinicus, or Edessa, or Harran, all deserted?  Or Laqabin, ʿArqa, Qlisura, Semha, Gubos, Qlaudia and Gargar—the seven dioceses around Melitene—where not a soul remains?

Despite the gloomy testimony of Bar Hebraeus, there is evidence that the diocese of Qlisura continued to exist at this period.  According to the colophon of a contemporary manuscript, the bishop Dioscorus of Qlisura, from the monastery of Mar Ahron near the city of Shigar, was among the fifteen bishops consecrated by the patriarch Philoxenus Nemrud (1283–92).

The diocese of Qlisura is not mentioned in any later source, and probably lapsed around the end of the thirteenth century.

Notes

References 
 
 
 Jean-Baptiste Chabot, Chronique de Michel le Syrien, Patriarche Jacobite d'Antiche (1166-1199). Éditée pour la première fois et traduite en francais I-IV (1899;1901;1905;1910; a supplement to volume I containing an introduction to Michael and his work, corrections, and an index, was published in 1924. Reprinted in four volumes 1963, 2010).

Syriac Orthodox dioceses
Oriental Orthodoxy in Turkey

nl:Lijst van Syrisch-orthodoxe aartsbisdommen van Antiochië